The following outline is provided as an overview of and topical guide to Cornwall:
Cornwall – ceremonial county and unitary authority area of England within the United Kingdom. Cornwall is a peninsula bordered to the north and west by the Celtic Sea, to the south by the English Channel, and to the east by the county of Devon, over the River Tamar. Cornwall is also a royal duchy of the United Kingdom. It has an estimated population of half a million and it has its own distinctive history and culture.

General reference
 Etymology of "Cornwall"
 Common English name(s): Cornwall
 Common endonym(s): Kernow 
 Adjectival(s): Cornish
 Demonym(s): Cornish

Geography of Cornwall 

Geography of Cornwall
 Cornwall is a mainland county of Great Britain and part of the British Isles. It reaches from the south-westernmost point into the Atlantic Ocean and English Channel. It is in Eurasia (but not on the mainland) in the Northern Hemisphere.

Environment of Cornwall 

 Climate of Cornwall – see climate of England
 Brown Willy effect
 Geology of Cornwall
 Geology of Lizard, Cornwall
 List of Special Areas of Conservation in Cornwall
 List of Sites of Special Scientific Interest in Cornwall

Natural geographic features of Cornwall

Extreme points 

 Lands End
 Lizard Point

Beaches of Cornwall 

 Beaches of Penwith
 Carbis Bay
 Crackington Haven
 Downderry
 Fistral Beach
 Gwithian
 Harlyn
 Maenporth
 Marazion
 Mawgan Porth
 Newquay
 Perranporth
 Polzeath
 Porthcothan
 Porthcurno
 Porthleven
 Porthtowan
 Portreath
 Praa Sands
 Rame Peninsula
 Rock, Cornwall
 Sennen
 St Mawes
 Widemouth Bay
 Whitsand Bay

Bodies of water of Cornwall 

 Rivers of Cornwall
 River Truro
 River Camel
 River Fal
River Fowey
 River Gannel
 Gover Stream
 Hamoaze
 Helford River
 River Looe
 River Lynher
 St Austell River
 River Tamar
 Bays of Cornwall
 Carbis Bay
 Widemouth Bay
 Whitsand Bay
 Coastal waters adjacent to Cornwall
 Atlantic Ocean
 Celtic Sea
 English Channel

Islands of Cornwall 

 It has several islands, the largest archipelago being the Isles of Scilly.
 West Cornwall Steam Ship Company (a company operating the ferry service to the Isles of Scilly between 1870 and 1917)
 History of the Isles of Scilly
 Islands in the Isles of Scilly
 Shipwrecks of the Isles of Scilly: category, list
 Transport in the Isles of Scilly
 Sites of Special Scientific Interest in the Isles of Scilly

Wildlife of Cornwall 

 Flora and fauna of Cornwall
 Cornish symbols

Flora of Cornwall 
 Cornish eyebright
 Cornish Gilliflower
 Cornish heath

Fauna of Cornwall 

 Birds of Cornwall
 Red-billed chough
 Cornish game hen
 Mammals of Cornwall
 Large Black (pig)

Wildlife conservation 

 Cornwall Wildlife Trust
 Frederick Hamilton Davey
 The Guild of Cornish Hedgers
 National Lobster Hatchery
 Westcountry Rivers Trust

Places in Cornwall 

 Population of Cornwall: 536,000 (2014 estimate)
Places in Cornwall
 List of places in Penwith
 Places of interest in Cornwall
 List of public art in Cornwall

Towns and settlements in Cornwall 

 Cornish and Breton twin towns
 List of civil parishes in Cornwall
 List of places in Cornwall
 Villages in Cornwall
 Albaston
 Bodmin
 Boscastle
 Bude
 Callington
 Calstock
 Camborne
 Camelford
 Falmouth
 Fowey
 Gunnislake
 Hayle
 Helston
 Launceston
 Liskeard
 Looe
 Lostwithiel
 Newquay
 Padstow
 Penryn
 Penzance
 Polperro
 Redruth
 Saltash
 St Austell
 St Columb Major
 St Ives
 St Just in Penwith
 St Mabyn
 Tintagel
 Torpoint
 Truro
 Wadebridge

Further places of interest
    indicates Access Land

 Aire Point to Carrick Du SSSI
 Ballowall Barrow
 Bodmin and Wenford Railway 
 Bodmin Gaol
 Bodmin Moor 
 Bolventor
 Brown Willy
 Camborne-Redruth
 Carn Brea
 Carn Euny
 Carn Marth
 Carrick Roads
 Castle An Dinas 
 Castle Dore
 Chacewater
 Chûn Castle 
 Chûn Quoit 
 Chysauster Ancient Village
 Commando Ridge, Bosigran
 Cornish Seal Sanctuary
 Cotehele 
 Dozmary Pool
 Drift Reservoir
 Dupath Well
 Eden Project
 Fistral Beach
 Glendurgan Garden 
 Godrevy Island 
 Goonhilly Downs
 Goss Moor NNR
 Halliggye Fogou
 Helford
 Helford River
 Helford Passage
 Helston Railway 
 The Hurlers 
 King Doniert's Stone
 King Edward Mine
 Kit Hill Country Park
 Kynance Cove 
 Land's End 
 Lanhydrock House 
 Lanyon Quoit 
 Lappa Valley Steam Railway
 Launceston Castle
 The Lizard 
 Lizard Point, Cornwall
 Loe Pool
 Lost Gardens of Heligan
 Mên-an-Tol 
 Mevagissey
 Minack Theatre
 Mount Edgcumbe Country Park
 Mount's Bay
 Mullion Cove 
 Mylor Bridge
 Pencarrow
 Pendennis Castle
 Penhallam
 Penjerrick Garden
 Penlee House
 Penwith
 Penwith Peninsula
 Poldhu 
 Polperro
 Porthcurno Museum of Submarine Telegraphy
 Restormel Castle
 River Fowey
 River Looe
 River Tamar
 Roseland Peninsula
 Royal Cornwall Museum
 Sancreed
 Seaton Valley Countryside Park
 Sennen
 Scorrier
 South West Coast Path
 St Breock Downs Monolith
 St Catherine's Castle
 St Mawes Castle
 St Michael's Mount 
 Tate St Ives
 Tehidy Country Park
 The Towans
 Tintagel Castle
 Trebah
 Tregiffian Burial Chamber
 Tregothnan
 Trelissick Garden 
 Trengwainton Garden
 Trerice
 Trethevy Quoit
 Truro Cathedral

Demography of Cornwall 

Demographics of Cornwall

Politics of Cornwall 

Politics of Cornwall
 Cornish nationalism
 Celtic League (political organisation)
 Cornish Nationalist Party
 Cornish Solidarity
 Cornwall 2000
 Cornish rotten and pocket boroughs
 Framework Convention for the Protection of National Minorities

Elections in Cornwall 

 2005 United Kingdom general election result in Cornwall
 Local elections
 Cornwall local elections
 Caradon local elections
 Carrick local elections
 Kerrier local elections
 North Cornwall local elections
 Penwith local elections
 Restormel local elections
 2007 Penwith Council election
 2004 Penwith Council election
 2003 Restormel Council election
 1987 Truro by-election
 2009 Cornwall Council election

Government of Cornwall 

 Cornish Assembly
 Cornwall Council
 Cornwall Record Office
 Parliamentary representation from Cornwall
 Revived Cornish Stannary Parliament
 Shadow Minister for Cornwall
 South West Regional Assembly

Local government districts in Cornwall 

Penwith
Kerrier
Carrick, Cornwall
Restormel
North Cornwall
Caradon

Constituencies 

 European Parliament constituencies
 Cornwall and Plymouth (European Parliament constituency)
 Cornwall and West Plymouth (European Parliament constituency)
 South West England (European Parliament constituency)
 UK Parliament constituencies
 St Ives (UK Parliament constituency)
 Falmouth and Camborne (UK Parliament constituency)
 Truro and St Austell (UK Parliament constituency)
 North Cornwall (UK Parliament constituency)
 South East Cornwall (UK Parliament constituency)
 Camborne and Redruth (UK Parliament constituency)
 St Austell and Newquay (UK Parliament constituency)
 Truro and Falmouth (UK Parliament constituency)
 Truro (UK Parliament constituency)
 Bodmin (UK Parliament constituency)
 Bossiney (UK Parliament constituency)
 Callington (UK Parliament constituency)
 Camelford (UK Parliament constituency)
 Cornwall (UK Parliament constituency)
 East Cornwall (UK Parliament constituency)
 West Cornwall (UK Parliament constituency)
 East Looe (UK Parliament constituency)
 Fowey (UK Parliament constituency)
 Grampound (UK Parliament constituency)
 Helston (UK Parliament constituency)
 Launceston (UK Parliament constituency)
 Liskeard (UK Parliament constituency)
 Lostwithiel (UK Parliament constituency)
 Mitchell (UK Parliament constituency)
 Newport (Cornwall) (UK Parliament constituency)
 Penryn (UK Parliament constituency)
 Penryn and Falmouth (UK Parliament constituency)
 St Austell (UK Parliament constituency)
 St Germans (UK Parliament constituency)
 St Mawes (UK Parliament constituency)
 Saltash (UK Parliament constituency)
 Tregony (UK Parliament constituency)
 West Looe (UK Parliament constituency)

Cornish politicians 

Current MPs
All of Cornwall's current MPs are Conservatives.
 Steve Double, MP for St. Austell and Newquay (2015–Present)
 George Eustice, MP for Camborne and Redruth (2010–Present)
 Scott Mann, MP for Cornwall North (2015–Present)
 Sheryll Murray, MP for South East Cornwall (2010–Present)
 Cherilyn Mackrory, MP for Truro and Falmouth (2019–Present)
 Derek Thomas, MP for St. Ives (2015–Present)

Past MPs
 Colin Breed, Liberal Democrat MP for South East Cornwall (1997–2010)
 Andrew George, Liberal Democrat MP for St. Ives (1997–2015)
 Steve Gilbert, Liberal Democrat MP for St. Austell and Newquay (2010–2015)
 Julia Goldsworthy, Liberal Democrat MP for Falmouth & Camborne (2005–2010)
 Sarah Newton, Conservative MP for Truro and Falmouth (2010–2019)
 Matthew Taylor, Liberal Democrat MP for Truro and St Austell from 1987 to 2010 (now a life peer as Baron Taylor of Goss Moor)
 Dan Rogerson, Liberal Democrat MP for North Cornwall (2005–2015)

Other politicians
 Mark Prisk, Shadow Minister for Cornwall from 2007 to 2010
 Mebyon Kernow, the main nationalist party in Cornwall
Dick Cole, the leader of Mebyon Kernow

Law and order in Cornwall 

 Constitutional status of Cornwall

Law enforcement in Cornwall 

Cornwall Police Force
Falmouth Docks Police

Royal titles 

 Duchy of Cornwall
 Duke of Cornwall
 Duchess of Cornwall
 High Sheriff of Cornwall
 Lord Lieutenant of Cornwall

Military in Cornwall 

:Category:Military of the United Kingdom in Cornwall
Vice-Admiral of Cornwall
List of Cornish soldiers, commanders and sailors
HMS Fisgard
HMS Raleigh
HMS St Austell Bay (K634)
The Duke of Cornwall's Light Infantry
Somerset and Cornwall Light Infantry
GCHQ Bude
RNAS Culdrose
RNAS Predannack
RRH Portreath
RAF Davidstow Moor
RAF St Eval
RAF St. Mawgan

History of Cornwall 

History of Cornwall
 Timeline of Cornish history
 List of Cornish historians
 Battle of Deorham
 Celtic nations
 Clyst Heath
 Clyst St Mary
 Cornish saints
 Cornovii (Cornish)
 Cornwall (territorial duchy)
 Duchies in the United Kingdom
 Dumnonia
 Dumnonii
 Fowey Gallants
 Glasney College
 Keskerdh Kernow 500
 Lew Trenchard
 List of windmills in Cornwall
 Maps of Cornwall
 Perkin Warbeck
 Robert, Count of Mortain
 Royal charters applying to Cornwall
 Stannary Courts and Parliaments
 Stannary town
 Stateless nation
 Torrey Canyon
 Woodbury Common, Devon

History of Cornwall by period 

 Cornish Uprising of 1497
 Cornish Uprising of 1497 - An Gof
 Cornish Uprising of 1497 - Thomas Flamank
 Second Cornish Uprising of 1497
 Act of Uniformity 1549
 Cornish Uprising of 1549
 Battle of Sampford Courtenay
 Jacobite uprising in Cornwall of 1715
 Cornwall in the English Civil War
 Battle of Cornwall
 Battle of Lostwithiel
 The Gear Rout
 Cornish Foreshore Case
 Penlee lifeboat disaster
 Newlyn riots
 POW Camp 115, Whitecross, St. Columb Major
 Revived Cornish Stannary Parliament

History of Cornwall by subject 
 List of former administrative divisions in Cornwall
 Bishop of Cornwall
 Cornish currency
 Custos Rotulorum of Cornwall
 History of the Duchy of Cornwall
 Earl of Cornwall
 Cornish emigration
 Hundreds of Cornwall
 Penwith (hundred)
 Kerrier (hundred)
 Triggshire (hundred)
 Kiddlywink
 List of legendary rulers of Cornwall
 Old Cornish units of measurement
 History of mining in Cornwall and Devon
 Early Cornish Texts

Disasters 
 Boscastle flood of 2004
 Penlee lifeboat disaster (1981)
 Sikorsky S-61 disaster 1983
 Torrey Canyon oil spill
 List of shipwrecks of Cornwall
 List of shipwrecks of Cornwall (19th century)
 List of shipwrecks of Cornwall (20th century)

Culture of Cornwall 
Culture of Cornwall
 Celtic culture
 Celts (modern)
 Celtic Congress
 Pan-Celticism
 Anglo-Celtic
 Cornish clothes
 Cornish tartans
 Festivals and events
 Royal Cornwall Show
 Cornish heritage organisations
 Federation of Old Cornwall Societies
 The Cornish Gorseth (Gorseth Kernow) (bards)
 Royal Institution of Cornwall
 Cornwall Record Office
 Museums in Cornwall
 Royal Cornwall Museum

The arts in Cornwall 
 Dance of Cornwall
 Cornish dance
 List of public art in Cornwall
 Theatre in Cornwall
 Kneehigh Theatre

Architecture in Cornwall 

 Bodmin Parish Church
 Cornwall Railway viaducts
 Eden Project
 Jamaica Inn
 Grade I listed buildings in Cornwall
 Grade II* listed buildings in Cornwall
 Grade II* listed buildings in Cornwall (A–G)
 Grade II* listed buildings in Cornwall (H–P)
 Grade II* listed buildings in Cornwall (Q–Z)
 List of museums in Cornwall
 Railway stations in Cornwall
 Royal Albert Bridge
 St German's Priory
 Tamar Bridge
 Tate St Ives
 Truro Cathedral
 List of windmills in Cornwall

Castles and houses in Cornwall 
 Launceston Castle
 Pendennis Castle
 Restormel Castle
 Trematon Castle
 Tintagel Castle
 Lanhydrock House
 Cotehele House
 Country houses in Cornwall
 Historic houses in Cornwall

Lighthouses in Cornwall 

 Bishop Rock Lighthouse
 Eddystone Lighthouse
 Godrevy Lighthouse
 Lizard Lighthouse
 Longships Lighthouse
 Pendeen Lighthouse
 Round Island Light, Isles of Scilly
 St. Anthony's Lighthouse
 Tater Du Lighthouse
 Trevose Head Lighthouse
 Wolf Rock Lighthouse

Literature of Cornwall 

Literature in Cornish
 Cornish novels
 The Camomile Lawn
 Frenchman's Creek
 Jamaica Inn (novel)
 Proper Job, Charlie Curnow (novel)
 The Poldark Novels
 Rebecca (novel)
 Cornish writers

Cornish folklore 

Cornish folklore
 Allantide
 Beast of Bodmin
 Chewidden Thursday
 Golowan
 Guise dancing
 Guldize
 Helston Furry Dance
 Kernewek Lowender
 Knocker (folklore)
 Mermaid of Zennor
 Nickanan Night
 Owlman
 Peter and the Piskies: Cornish Folk and Fairy Tales
 Picrous Day
 Pixie (folklore)
 St Piran's Day
 Tom Bawcock's Eve
 West Cornwall May Day celebrations

Media in Cornwall 
Media in Cornwall
 Doc Martin
 Jamaica Inn (film)
 Rebecca (1940 film)
 Straw Dogs
 Wild West (sitcom)
 Wycliffe (TV series)

Music of Cornwall 

Cornish music
 The Cornish National Anthem
 Genres
 Britpop
 Celtic music
 Bands
 Thirteen Senses
 The Onyx
 Kubb (band)
 Instruments
 Cornish bagpipes
 Musical works
 The Pirates of Penzance
 Tintagel – symphonic poem composed by Arnold Bax in 1919; it is perhaps his best-known orchestral work.
 Four Cornish Dances by Malcolm Arnold
 Cornish musicians
 Al Hodge
 Dudley Savage
 Aphex Twin
 Luke Vibert
 Brenda Wootton

Cuisine of Cornwall 

Cuisine of Cornwall
 Food
 List of Cornish cheeses
 Cornish pasty
 Clotted cream
 Cornish fairings
 Cornish Gilliflower
 Heavy cake
 Hog's pudding
 Saffron bun
 Stargazy pie
 Cornish Yarg
 Drink
 Cyder
 Meadery
 Sharp's Brewery
 Skinner's Brewery
 St Austell Brewery

Icons of Cornwall 

 List of Cornish flags
 Cornish symbols
 Saint Piran's Flag
 The Song of the Western Men
 Bro Goth Agan Tasow

Language in Cornwall 

 Languages of Cornwall
 Cornish language
 Modern Cornish
 Unified Cornish
 Anglo-Cornish
 List of linguists and writers in Cornish
 List of Cornish dialect words
 Cornish surnames
 Oggy Oggy Oggy
 Kernowek Standard
 Kernewek Kemmyn

Cornish words and names 

 List of Cornish dialect words
 Emmet (Cornish)
 Penna (surname)
 Cornish surnames
 Treffry
 Baragwanath

Linguistics organizations 

 Agan Tavas
 Akademi Kernewek
 Cornish Language Council (Cussel an Tavas Kernuak)
 Cornish Language Partnership
 Dalleth
 Kesva an Taves Kernewek
 Kowethas an Yeth Kernewek
 Movyans Skolyow Meythrin
 Skol Veythrin Karenza

Linguists 

 Vanessa Beeman
 John Boson (writer)
 Nicholas Boson
 Bernard Deacon
 Richard Gendall
 Ken George
 E. G. Retallack Hooper
 Henry Jenner
 Rod Lyon
 Robert Morton Nance
 Nicholas Williams

People of Cornwall 

 Celts
 List of people from Cornwall
 Cornish people
 Cornish diaspora
 Cornish people
 Cornish saints
 Cornish wrestling champions
 Cornish writers
 List of Cornish artists, architects and craftspeople
 List of Cornish Christians
 List of Cornish engineers and inventors
 List of Cornish geologists and explorers
 List of Cornish historians
 List of Cornish musicians
 List of Cornish philanthropists
 List of Cornish scientists and inventors
 List of Cornish soldiers, commanders and sailors
 List of Cornish sportsmen and sportswomen
 List of Cornish writers
 List of notable residents of Cornwall

Noble and notable families 
 Earl of Cornwall
 Duke of Cornwall
 Duchess of Cornwall
 Great Cornish Families
Arundell of Lanherne

Religion in Cornwall 

 Religion in Cornwall
 Christianity in Cornwall
 Archdeacon of Cornwall
 List of Cornish saints
 Bishop of Truro
 Celtic Christianity
 Diocese of Exeter
 Diocese of Truro
 List of notable Cornish Christians
 Roman Catholic Diocese of Plymouth
 Truro Cathedral

Sport in Cornwall 

Sport in Cornwall
Cornish wrestling
Cornish hurling
Rugby union in Cornwall
Cornish Pirates
Camborne RFC
Falmouth RFC
Helston RFC
Launceston RUFC
Mounts Bay RFC
Redruth R.F.C.
Wadebridge Camels
Cornwall Combination
Cornish pilot gig
Surfers Against Sewage
Royal Fowey Yacht Club
Quay Sailing Club

Trelawny Pitbulls
Trelawny Tigers
Cornwall County Cricket Club
Falmouth Town A.F.C.
Frederick Stanley Jackson
Launceston F.C.
Liskeard Athletic F.C.
Millbrook A.F.C.
Newquay A.F.C.
Penryn Athletic F.C.
Penzance A.F.C.
Porthleven F.C.
A.F.C. St Austell
Saltash United F.C.
Torpoint Athletic F.C.
Truro City F.C.
Wadebridge Town F.C.

Economy and infrastructure of Cornwall 

Economy of Cornwall
 Agriculture of Cornwall
 List of farms in Cornwall
 Fishing in Cornwall
 Royal Cornwall Show
 Communications in Cornwall
 Media in Cornwall
 Companies based in Cornwall
 Economic development
 South West Regional Assembly
 South West of England Regional Development Agency

Mining in Cornwall 

Mining in Cornwall

 Bal maiden
 Camborne School of Mines
 Crown Mines
 Dolcoath mine
 South Crofty
 Wheal Jane
 Geevor Tin Mine
 Mount Wellington Tin Mine
 King Edward Mine
 Levant Mine & Beam Engine

 Cornwall and West Devon Mining Landscape
 CSM Association
 Royal Cornwall Polytechnic Society
 Royal Geological Society of Cornwall
 School of Metalliferous Mining
 The Miners Association
 National Association of Mining History Organisations
 Cornish Mines & Engines (Pool)
 Lostwithiel Stannary Palace
 Cornish stamps

Transport in Cornwall 

Transport in Cornwall

Air travel in Cornwall 

 Bodmin Airfield
 British International Helicopters
 Isles of Scilly Skybus
 Land's End Airport
 Newquay Airport
 Penzance Heliport
 Perranporth Airfield
 St Mary's Airport
 Tresco Heliport
 Truro Aerodrome

Rail transport in Cornwall

Railways (present day) 

 Atlantic Coast Line, Cornwall
 Cornish Main Line
 Devon and Cornwall Rail Partnership
 Looe Valley Line
 Maritime Line
 Railway stations in Cornwall
 St Ives Bay Line
 Tamar Valley Line

Railways (heritage & history) 

 Bodmin and Wadebridge Railway
 Cornish Riviera Express
 Cornwall Minerals Railway
 Cornwall Railway
 Cornwall Railway viaducts
 GWR 3700 Class 3440 City of Truro
 Disused railway stations (Bodmin to Wadebridge line)
 Disused railway stations (Plymouth to Penzance Line)
 Helston Railway Preservation Company
 Lostwithiel and Fowey Railway
 Newquay and Cornwall Junction Railway
 Truro and Newquay Railway
 Treffry Viaduct
 West Cornwall Railway

Roads in Cornwall 
 A30
 A374
 A38
 A39 (Atlantic Highway)

Buses and coaches in Cornwall 
 Go Cornwall Bus
 Kernow Buses (run by First South West)
 Truronian
 Western Greyhound

Maritime transport in Cornwall

Ships and boats in Cornwall 
 Clio (barque)
 Falmouth Lifeboat Station
 Falmouth Quay Punt
 List of shipwrecks of Cornwall
 Penlee Lifeboat Station
 Scillonian (disambiguation)
 Spirit of Mystery
 Torpoint Ferry

Canals 
 Bude Canal
 Liskeard & Looe Union Canal
 Par Canal
 Parnall's Canal
 St Columb Canal

Healthcare in Cornwall 

Healthcare in Cornwall
 Ambulance services in Cornwall
 Cornwall Air Ambulance
 South Western Ambulance Service
 Health services in Cornwall
 Cornwall Partnership NHS Foundation Trust
 Peninsula Community Health
 Royal Cornwall Hospitals NHS Trust
 Hospitals in Cornwall
 Bodmin Hospital
 Camborne Redruth Community Hospital
 Royal Cornwall Hospital
 Royal Cornwall Infirmary
 St Michael's Hospital, Hayle
 St Lawrence's Hospital, Bodmin
 West Cornwall Hospital
 Hospices in Cornwall
 Children's Hospice South West
 Cornwall Hospice Care

Education in Cornwall 

 List of museums in Cornwall
 List of schools in Cornwall

Primary education
 Five Islands Academy
 St Mabyn Church of England Primary School

Secondary education
 Callywith College
 Cornwall College
 Falmouth School
 Glasney College
 Humphry Davy School
 Penair School
 Poltair School
 Richard Lander School
 Truro and Penwith College
 Truro High School
 Truro School

Tertiary education
 Camborne School of Mines
 Combined Universities in Cornwall
 Falmouth University
 Institute of Cornish Studies
 University of Exeter, Cornwall Campus

See also 

 Index of Cornwall-related articles
 Outline of the United Kingdom
 Outline of England
 List of railway stations in Cornwall
 List of residents of Penzance
 List of Sites of Special Scientific Interest in Cornwall
 List of Special Areas of Conservation in Cornwall
 List of foreign-language names for Cornwall
 Kernow - Cornish language Wikipedia

References

External links 

 Cornwall Council

 Images of Cornwall at the English Heritage Archive

 
Cornwall
Cornwall